Old Catonsville Historic District is a national historic district in Catonsville, Baltimore County, Maryland, United States. It was laid out with the construction of the electric railway and is overwhelmingly residential, with three churches (one with a school), a modern public library, and an Art Deco water tower. Architectural styles in the district range from mid- to late-19th century vernacular "I-houses" to late-19th and early-20th century styles such as Queen Anne, Bungalow, Colonial Revival, Dutch Colonial, Tudor Revival, and Craftsman. A large number of these dwellings have freestanding garages, typically finished in a like manner to their houses.

It was added to the National Register of Historic Places in 2002.

References

External links
, including photo dated 2004, at Maryland Historical Trust
Boundary Map of the Old Catonsville Historic District, Baltimore County, at Maryland Historical Trust

Catonsville, Maryland
Historic districts in Baltimore County, Maryland
Historic districts on the National Register of Historic Places in Maryland
National Register of Historic Places in Baltimore County, Maryland